The Multan Regiment was a regiment of the British Indian Army that saw action in the Battle of Ghazni, during the First Afghan War in 1839. The regiment was based in the city of Multan, where it was first raised. Since the independence of Pakistan in 1947, it has been part of the Pakistan Army.

References

British Indian Army regiments
Indian World War I regiments
Indian World War II regiments